Charlie Yancy Larumbe Beaton (born 12 April 1995) is a professional footballer who plays as a midfielder for Cebu.

Career statistics

Club

Notes

References

1995 births
Living people
Sportspeople from Cavite
Filipino footballers
Citizens of the Philippines through descent
Philippines youth international footballers
Filipino people of English descent
Association football midfielders
Philippines Football League players
Watford F.C. players
F.C. Meralco Manila players
Kaya F.C. players
Ilocos United F.C. players
JPV Marikina F.C. players
Global Makati F.C. players
Cebu F.C. players